Cambarus cymatilis, the Conasauga blue burrower is a species of burrowing crayfish in the family Cambaridae. It is native to Tennessee and Georgia in the United States. The common name refers to the Conasauga River.

The IUCN conservation status of Cambarus cymatilis is "EN", endangered. The species faces a high risk of extinction in the near future. The IUCN status was reviewed in 2010.

References

Further reading

 
 
 

Cambaridae
Articles created by Qbugbot
Crustaceans described in 1970
Freshwater crustaceans of North America
Taxa named by Horton H. Hobbs Jr.